

Events
Below, the events of World War II have the "WWII" prefix.

January

 January–August – 10,072 men, women and children with mental and physical disabilities are asphyxiated with carbon monoxide in a gas chamber, at Hadamar Euthanasia Centre in Germany, in the first phase of mass killings under the Action T4 program here.
 January 1 – Thailand's Prime Minister Plaek Phibunsongkhram decrees January 1 as the official start of the Thai solar calendar new year (thus the previous year that began April 1 had only 9 months).
 January 3 – A decree (Normalschrifterlass) promulgated in Germany by Martin Bormann, on behalf of Adolf Hitler, requires replacement of blackletter typefaces by Antiqua.
 January 4 – The short subject Elmer's Pet Rabbit is released, marking the second appearance of Bugs Bunny, and also the first to have his name on a title card.
 January 5 – WWII: Battle of Bardia in Libya: Australian and British troops defeat Italian forces, the first battle of the war in which an Australian Army formation takes part.
 January 6
 During his State of the Union address, President of the United States Franklin D. Roosevelt presents his Four Freedoms, as fundamental global human rights.
 The keel of battleship  is laid at the New York Navy Yard in Brooklyn.
 January 10 – The Lend-Lease Act is introduced into the United States Congress.
 January 11 – WWII: The British Royal Navy light cruiser  is bombed, catches fire and has to be sunk off Malta, with the loss of 81 crew.
 January 13 – All persons born in Puerto Rico since this day are declared U.S. citizens by birth, through U.S. federal law.
 January 14 
 WWII: Commerce raiding German auxiliary cruiser Pinguin captures the Norwegian whaling fleet near Bouvet Island, effectively ending Southern Ocean whaling for the duration of the war.
 In a BBC radio broadcast from London, Victor de Laveleye asks all Belgians to use the letter "V" as a rallying sign, being the first letter of victoire (victory) in French and of vrijheid (freedom) in Dutch. This is the beginning of the "V campaign" which sees "V" graffities on the walls of Belgium and later all of Europe and introduces the use of the "V sign" for victory and freedom. Winston Churchill adopts the sign soon afterwards, though he sometimes gets it the wrong way around and uses the common insult gesture.
 January 15 – John Vincent Atanasoff and Clifford Berry describe the workings of the Atanasoff–Berry computer in print.
 January 19 – WWII: British troops attack Italian-held Eritrea in Africa.
 January 20 – Franklin D. Roosevelt is sworn in for a third term as President of the United States.
 January 22
 WWII: Battle of Tobruk: Australian and British forces capture Tobruk from the Italians.
 In Sweden, Victor Hasselblad registers the Hasselblad Camera Company.
 January 23 – Aviator Charles Lindbergh testifies before the U.S. Congress, and recommends that the United States negotiate a neutrality pact with Adolf Hitler.
 January 27 – WWII: Joseph Grew, the U.S. ambassador to Japan, reports to Washington a rumor overheard at a diplomatic reception, concerning a planned surprise attack on Pearl Harbor, Hawaii.
 January 28 – Subhas Chandra Bose, the chief of the separatist Indian National Army, reaches Kabul, Afghanistan by successfully evading the British authorities in British India.
 January 30 – WWII: Australians capture Derna, Libya, from the Italians.

February

 February 3 – WWII: The Nazis forcibly restore Pierre Laval to the office of Prime Minister in occupied Vichy France.
 February 4 – WWII: The United Service Organization (USO) is created to entertain American troops.
 February 5 – The Air Training Corps is formed in the United Kingdom.
 February 5–April 1 – WWII: Battle of Keren – British and Free French Forces fight hard to capture the strategic town of Keren in Italian Eritrea.
 February 6 – WWII: Benghazi falls to the Western Desert Force. Lieutenant-General Erwin Rommel is appointed commander of Afrika Korps.
 February 8 – WWII: The U.S. House of Representatives passes the Lend-Lease Act.
 February 9 – Winston Churchill, in a worldwide broadcast, tells the United States to show its support by sending arms to the British: "Give us the tools, and we will finish the job."
 February 12
 WWII: Erwin Rommel arrives in Tripoli.
 Reserve Constable Albert Alexander, a patient at the Radcliffe Infirmary in Oxford, England, becomes the first person treated with penicillin intravenously, by Howard Florey's team. He reacts positively, but there is insufficient supply of the drug to reverse his terminal infection. A successful treatment is achieved during May.
 February 13 – Aircraft from British carrier  attack Massawa in Eritrea.
 February 14 – WWII: Admiral Kichisaburō Nomura begins his duties as Japanese Ambassador to the United States.
 February 19–22 – WWII: Three Nights' Blitz over Swansea, South Wales: Over these 3 nights of intensive bombing, which lasts a total of 13 hours and 48 minutes, Swansea's town centre is almost completely obliterated by the 896 high explosive bombs employed by the Luftwaffe; 397 casualties and 230 deaths are reported.
 February 22 – WWII: British cruiser  bombards Barawa, on the coast between Kismayo and Mogadishu.
 February 23 – Glenn T. Seaborg and associates isolate and discover plutonium, at the University of California, Berkeley.
 February 25 – WWII:
 The occupied Netherlands starts the first popular uprising in Europe against the Axis powers, the "February strike" against German deportation of Jews in Amsterdam and surroundings.
 British submarine  attacks an Italian convoy, sinking the cruiser Armando Diaz.
 February 27 – WWII: The New Zealand Division cruiser HMS Leander (1931) sinks Italian armed merchant raider Ramb I off the Maldives.

March

 March 1
 WWII: Bulgaria signs the Tripartite Pact, thus joining the Axis powers.
 Arthur L. Bristol becomes Rear Admiral for the United States Navy's Support Force, Atlantic Fleet.
 March 4 – WWII: Operation Claymore – British Commandos carry out a successful raid on the Lofoten Islands, off the north coast of Norway.
 March 8 – WWII: The U.S. Senate passes the Lend-Lease Act.
 March 11 – WWII: Franklin D. Roosevelt, President of the United States, signs the Lend-Lease Act into law, providing for the U.S. to provide Lend-Lease aid to the Allies.
 March 15 – Richard C. Hottelet is arrested by the Gestapo on "suspicion of espionage", but eventually released in July as part of a prisoner exchange with the U.S.
 March 16 – A group of U.S. warships arrive in Auckland, New Zealand, on a goodwill visit. On March 20, they arrive in Sydney, Australia.
 March 17
 In Washington, D.C., the National Gallery of Art is officially opened by President Franklin D. Roosevelt.
 British Minister of Labour Ernest Bevin calls for women to fill vital jobs.
 March 22 – Washington state's Grand Coulee Dam begins to generate electricity.
 March 24 – WWII: Rommel launches his first offensive in Cyrenaica.
 March 25 – WWII: The Kingdom of Yugoslavia joins the Axis powers in Vienna.
 March 27 – WWII:
 Battle of Cape Matapan: Off the Peloponnese coast in the Mediterranean, British naval forces defeat those of Italy, sinking 5 warships (the battle ends on March 29).
 Yugoslav coup d'état: An anti-Axis coup d'état in the Kingdom of Yugoslavia led by General Dušan Simović, Brigadier General Borivoje Mirković, Colonels Dragutin Savić and Stjepan Burazović, Colonel General Miodrag Lazić, Milorad Petrović and many other general officers (with British support) forces Prince Paul into exile; 17-year-old King Peter II assumes power following the coup and Simović is elected new Prime Minister of Yugoslavia.
 Japanese spy Takeo Yoshikawa arrives in Honolulu to study the United States Pacific Fleet at Pearl Harbor, in preparation for a future attack.
 March 30 – WWII:
 All German, Italian and Danish ships anchored in United States waters are taken into "protective custody".
 A German Lorenz cipher machine operator sends a 4,000-character message twice, allowing British mathematician Bill Tutte to decipher the machine's coding mechanism.

April

 April – The Valley of Geysers is discovered on the Kamchatka Peninsula of Russia, by Tatyana Ustinova.
 April 1 – A military coup d'état, launched by Rashid Ali Al-Gaylani, overthrows the pro-British regime in Iraq.
 April 4 – WWII: Axis forces capture Benghazi.
 April 6 – WWII: Germany invades Yugoslavia and the Battle of Greece begins.
 April 9 – The U.S. acquires full military defense rights in Greenland.
 April 10 – WWII:
 U.S. destroyer , while picking up survivors from a sunken Dutch freighter, drops depth charges on a German U-boat (the first "shot in anger" fired by America against Germany).
 The Independent State of Croatia, a puppet state of the Axis powers, is established with Ustashe leader Ante Pavelić as head (Poglavnik) of the government.
 April 12 – WWII: German troops enter Belgrade.
 April 13 – The Soviet–Japanese Neutrality Pact is signed. 
 April 15 – WWII: Axis forces reach Halfaya Pass, on the Libyan-Egyptian frontier.
 April 18 – WWII:
 The Yugoslav Royal Army capitulates.
 Greek Prime Minister Alexandros Koryzis commits suicide as German troops approach Athens.
 April 19 – Bertolt Brecht's anti-war play Mother Courage and Her Children receives its first theatrical production, at the Schauspielhaus Zürich.
 April 21 – WWII: Greece capitulates to Germany. Commonwealth troops and some elements of the Greek Army withdraw to Crete.
 April 23 – The America First Committee holds its first mass rally in New York City, with Charles Lindbergh as keynote speaker.
 April 25 – Franklin D. Roosevelt, at his regular press conference, criticizes Charles Lindbergh by comparing him to the Copperheads of the Civil War period. In response, Lindbergh resigns his commission in the U.S. Army Air Corps Reserve on April 28.
 April 27 – WWII: German troops enter Athens.
 April 28 – World War II persecution of Serbs: Gudovac massacre – Members of the Croatian nationalist Ustashe movement kill around 190 Bjelovar Serbs in the village of Gudovac, in the Independent State of Croatia.

May 

 May 1
 The breakfast cereal Cheerios is introduced as CheeriOats by General Mills in the United States.
 Orson Welles' film Citizen Kane premieres in New York City.
 The first Defense Bonds and Defense Savings Stamps go on sale in the United States, to help fund the greatly increased production of military equipment.
 May 2 – Anglo-Iraqi War: British combat operations against the rebel government of Rashid Ali in the Kingdom of Iraq begin.
 May 5 – WWII: Emperor Haile Selassie enters Addis Ababa, which has been liberated from Italian forces; this date is subsequently commemorated as Liberation Day in Ethiopia.
 May 6 – At California's March Field, entertainer Bob Hope performs his first USO Show.
 May 8 – WWII: The German auxiliary cruiser Pinguin is sunk by British cruiser  in the Indian Ocean; 555 are killed.
 May 9 – WWII:  is captured by the British Royal Navy. On board is the latest Enigma cryptography machine, which Allied cryptographers later use to break coded German messages.
 May 10
 WWII: The British House of Commons is damaged by the Luftwaffe in an air raid on London.
 Rudolf Hess parachutes into Scotland, claiming to be on a peace mission.
 May 11/May 12 – WWII: The Ustaše massacre 260–373 Serb men in a Catholic church in Glina, Croatia, where the men have assembled to be received into the Catholic faith in exchange for their lives.
 May 12 – Konrad Zuse presents the Z3, the world's first working programmable, fully automatic computer, in Berlin.
 May 13 – WWII: Yugoslav General Draža Mihailović and a group of 80 soldiers and officers cross the Drina river in Bosnia and Herzegovina, arrive at Ravna Gora, in western Nazi-occupied Serbia and start fighting with German occupation troops.
 May 15
 The first British jet aircraft, the Gloster E.28/39, is flown.
 Joe DiMaggio's 56-game hitting streak begins, as the New York Yankees' center fielder goes 1 for 4 against Chicago White Sox pitcher Eddie Smith in baseball.
 May 19 – The Viet Minh is formed at Pác Bó in Vietnam, to overthrow French rule of the nation, as an alliance between the Indochina Communist party, led by Ho Chi Minh, and the Nationalist party. It will become the Viet Cong during the Vietnam War.
 May 20 – WWII: The Battle of Crete begins, as Germany launches an airborne invasion of Crete, the first mainly airborne invasion in military history.
 May 24 – WWII:
 In the North Atlantic,  sinks British battlecruiser , killing all but 3 crewmen, from a total of 1,418 aboard the pride of the Royal Navy.
 British submarine  torpedoes and sinks Italian ocean liner .
 May 27
 WWII: Franklin D. Roosevelt, President of the United States, proclaims an "unlimited national emergency."
 WWII: German battleship Bismarck is sunk in the North Atlantic, killing 2,300. It is eventually found in 1989.
 The Swiss Socialist Federation is banned.
 May 29 – The Disney animators' strike begins, due to lack of recognition by Walt Disney of his animators' inequities of pay and privileges.
 May 30 – WWII: Manolis Glezos and Apostolos Santas tear down the Nazi swastika on the Acropolis in Athens and replace it with the Greek flag.
 May 31 – Anglo-Iraqi War: British troops complete the re-occupation of the Kingdom of Iraq, returning Prince 'Abd al-Ilah to power as regent for Faisal II.

June 

 June 1 – WWII: The Battle of Crete ends, as Crete surrenders to invading German forces.
 June 4 
 Guidelines for the Conduct of the Troops in Russia are issued by Nazi high-command through OKW. This order (a lesser known precursor to the Commisar Order) explicitly commands that Jews (in addition to Bolshevik partisans and Commisars) be killed. In a sense, this order – in combination with the Commissar Order about to be delivered, and Goring's instruction to Heydrich to look into logistics later in the month, that is mentioned at the beginning of the Wannsee Conference of the following year – inaugurates the European Holocaust of the Jews.
 June 5
 Second Sino-Japanese War: Four thousand Chongqing residents are asphyxiated in a bomb shelter during the Bombing of Chongqing.
 Smederevo Fortress explosion: A Serbian ammunition depot explodes at Smederevo on the outskirts of Belgrade, Serbia, killing 2,500 and injuring over 4,500.
 June 6 – WWII: The Commissar Order is issued by Oberkommando der Wehrmacht, requiring all Soviet political commissars identified in Operation Barbarossa among captured forces to receive summary execution.
 June 8 – WWII: British and Free French forces invade Syria.
 June 13 – TASS, the official Soviet news agency, denies reports of tension between Germany and the Soviet Union.
 June 14
 June deportation: Soviet officials deport about 65,000 people from Estonia, Latvia and Lithuania to Siberia.
 All German and Italian assets in the United States are frozen.
 June 16
 All German and Italian consulates in the United States are ordered closed, and their staffs to leave the country by July 10.
 WWII: British Fleet Air Arm aircraft sink the Vichy ship Chevalier Paul.
 June 18 – The German–Turkish Treaty of Friendship is signed between Nazi Germany and Turkey, in Ankara.
 June 20
 The United States Army Air Corps becomes the United States Army Air Forces, with the earlier name reserved solely for the new USAAF's logistics and training elements.
 Walt Disney's live-action/animated feature The Reluctant Dragon is released.
 June 22
 WWII: Operation Barbarossa: Nazi Germany (with allies) invades the Soviet Union and declares war on it. Winston Churchill promises all possible British assistance to the Soviet Union in a worldwide broadcast: "Any man or state who fights against Nazidom will have our aid. Any man or state who marches with Hitler is our foe." Italy and Romania declare war on the Soviet Union.
 WWII: The First Sisak Partisan Brigade, the first anti-fascist armed unit in occupied Europe, is founded by Yugoslav partisans near Sisak, Croatia.
 June Uprising in Lithuania: A Provisional Government of Lithuania is established by the Lithuanian Activist Front, in an attempt to liberate Lithuania from Soviet occupation.
 Rapid escalation of the Holocaust in Lithuania: Between now and the end of the year, an estimated 190,000-195,000 out of 210,000 Lithuanian Jews will be massacred, killing an estimated 95% of the nation's Jewish population.
 Rapid Vienna beats Schalke 04, in the final of the German Fottballchampionship, after 0:3 with 4:3.
 June 23 – WWII: Hungary and Slovakia declare war on the Soviet Union.
 June 24
 The Soviet Information Bureau, predecessor of RIA Novosti, is founded.
 Rainiai massacre: Approximately 80 political prisoners are killed by the NKVD in Lithuania.
 June 25 – WWII: Finland (as a co-belligerent with Germany) attacks the Soviet Union, starting the Continuation War.
 June 28 – WWII: Albania declares war on the Soviet Union.
 June 28–30 – The Holocaust: The Iași pogrom takes place, killing "at least 13,266" Romanian Jews.
 June 29 – WWII: Hitler's second-in-command, Reichsmarshall Hermann Göring, is appointed as Hitler's successor in a written decree. The decree will come into effect, should Hitler die in the middle of the war. (The decree becomes void in April 1945, after Göring tries to assume power while Hitler is still alive, leading to Göring's expulsion from the Nazi Party.)

July

 July – The British Army's Special Air Service is formed.
 July 1
 Commercial television is authorized by the Federal Communications Commission in the United States.
 NBC Television begins commercial operation on WNBT, on Channel 1. The world's first legal TV commercial, for Bulova watches, occurs at 2:29 PM over WNBT, before a baseball game between the Brooklyn Dodgers and Philadelphia Phillies. The 10-second spot displays a picture of a clock superimposed on a map of the United States, accompanied by the voice-over "America runs on Bulova time." As a one-off special, the first quiz show called "Uncle Bee" is telecast on WNBT's inaugural broadcast day, followed later the same day by Ralph Edwards hosting the second game show broadcast on U.S. television, Truth or Consequences, as simulcast on radio and TV and sponsored by Ivory Soap. Weekly broadcasts of the show commence in 1956, with Bob Barker.
 CBS Television begins commercial operation on New York station WCBW (modern-day WCBS-TV), on Channel 2.
 WWII:
 German forces capture Riga.
 Germany and Italy recognize the Japanese-sponsored Chinese reorganized national government under Wang Jingwei as the legitimate government of China. 
 July 2 – WWII: The Empire of Japan calls up 1 million men for military service.
 July 3 – WWII: Joseph Stalin, in his first address since the German invasion, calls upon the Soviet people to carry out a "scorched earth" policy of resistance to the bitter end.
 July 4 – Massacre of Lviv professors: Polish scientists and writers are murdered by Nazi German troops in the occupied Polish city of Lwów.
 July 5 – WWII:
 Operation Barbarossa: German troops reach the Dnieper River.
 July 5–31: Ecuadorian–Peruvian War is fought.
 July 7
 Uprising in Serbia: The Communist Party of Yugoslavia raises an uprising against the Nazi occupation, beginning when Žikica Jovanović Španac kill two gendarmes in the village of Bela Crkva, 
 WWII: American forces take over the defense of Iceland from the British. 
 July 10 – The Holocaust: Jedwabne pogrom: Local ethnic Poles massacre at least 340 Jewish residents of Jedwabne, in occupied Poland. The Jewish residents are locked in a barn and the barn set on fire
 July 11 – The Northern Rhodesian Labour Party holds its first congress in Nkana.
 July 13
 WWII: An uprising in Montenegro against the Axis powers starts, the second popular uprising in Europe (the first being the "February strike" of February 25 (above) in the Netherlands).
 Clemens August Graf von Galen, Catholic Bishop of Münster in Germany, preaches the first of 3 sermons against Nazi brutality.
 July 14 – WWII: Vichy France signs armistice terms ending all fighting in Syria and Lebanon.
 July 17 – Joe DiMaggio's 56-game hitting streak ends.
 July 19
 WWII: A BBC broadcast by "Colonel Britton" (Douglas Ritchie) calls on the people of occupied Europe to resist the Nazis, under the slogan "V for Victory".
 The Tom and Jerry cartoon short The Midnight Snack is released; it is the second appearance for the duo, and the first in which they are officially named. 
 July 23 – WWII: Italian aircraft damage the British destroyer  which has to be sunk.
 July 25 – Postal codes in Germany are introduced.
 July 26 – WWII:
 In response to the Japanese occupation of French Indochina, U.S. President Franklin D. Roosevelt orders the seizure of all Japanese assets in the United States.
 General Douglas MacArthur is named commander of all U.S. forces in the Philippines; the Philippines Army is ordered nationalized by President Roosevelt.
 July 29 – The Vichy Regime signs the Protocol Concerning Joint Defense and Joint Military Cooperation with the Empire of Japan, giving the Japanese a total of 8 airfields, allowing them greater troop presence, and the use of the Indochinese financial system, in return for continued French autonomy.
 July 30 – WWII: Glina massacre of July–August 1941 – The Ustaše brutally kill 200 Serbs inside a Serbian Orthodox church in Glina, Croatia, with a total of 700–1,200 being killed in the area of the next few days.
 July 31 – WWII: The Holocaust: Under instructions from Adolf Hitler, Nazi official Hermann Göring orders S.S. General Reinhard Heydrich to "submit to me as soon as possible a general plan of the administrative material and financial measures necessary for carrying out the desired Final Solution of the Jewish question."

August

 August – The Political Warfare Executive is formed in the United Kingdom to disseminate propaganda to Germany and its occupied countries.
 August 1 – The Willys MB U.S. Army Jeep is first produced.
 August 5 – The Provisional Government of Lithuania is dissolved.
 August 6 – Six-year-old Elaine Esposito goes to have an appendix operation in Florida and lapses into a coma, dying 37 years later, still comatose. 
 August 7 – WWII: British submarine  sinks an Italian Marconi-class submarine.
 August 9 – Franklin D. Roosevelt and Winston Churchill meet on board ship at Naval Station Argentia, Newfoundland. The Atlantic Charter (released August 14), setting goals for postwar international cooperation, is created as a result.
 August 16
 The Holocaust: Units of the Wehrmacht and the Einsatzgruppen (as part of Operation Barbarossa) start killing Jewish children, signalling the start of the Jewish Genocide.
  Royal Navy Signals School and Combined Signals School opens at Leydene, near Petersfield, Hampshire, England.
 August 19 – The Tiraspol Agreement is signed between Germany and Romania.
 August 21 – In revenge for the execution two days earlier of French Resistance member Samuel Tyszelman, communist activist Pierre Georges (with others) shoots and kills a member of the German military in occupied Paris, initiating a cycle of assassinations and retribution that will claim hundreds of lives.
 August 25 – WWII: The Anglo-Soviet invasion of Iran to secure the Persian Corridor and oilfields begins.
 August 27 – WWII: Kamianets-Podilskyi massacre, 23,600 Jews are shot dead by Einsatzgruppen troops and local collaborators in Ukraine.
 August 28 – WWII: Soviet evacuation of Tallinn – German troops capture Tallinn, Estonia from the Soviet Union, while attacks on the evacuating Soviet ships leave more than 12,000 dead in one of the bloodiest naval battles of the war. German forces will capture the entire Estonian territory by December 6.
 August 29
 WWII: The Government of National Salvation, a Serb puppet state of the Axis powers, is established by General Milan Nedić in Nazi-occupied Serbia in Belgrade, under military commander Heinrich Danckelmann; the regime includes 15 Ministers.
 Robert Menzies resigns as Prime Minister of Australia, after losing the support of his party. He will not return to the Prime Ministership until 1949. Arthur Fadden, leader of the Country Party, consequently becomes Prime Minister, while former Prime Minister Billy Hughes replaces Menzies as UAP leader.
 August 30
 German troopship Bahia Laura is sunk by British submarine ; 450 are killed.
 Germany and Romania sign another treaty, the Tighina Agreement.
 August 31
 WWII (Uprising in Serbia): Battle of Loznica: Chetniks capture the town of Loznica in Nazi-occupied Serbia.
 The Great Gildersleeve debuts on NBC Radio in the United States.

September

 September 3 – The Holocaust: SS-Hauptsturmführer Karl Fritzsch first uses the pesticide Zyklon B to execute Soviet prisoners of war en masse at Auschwitz concentration camp; eventually it will be used to kill about 1.2 million people.
 September 6 – The Holocaust: The requirement to wear a yellow badge with the Star of David and the word "Jew" (Jude) inscribed, is extended to all Jews over the age of 6 in German-occupied areas.
 September 8 – WWII: Siege of Leningrad – German forces begin a siege against the Soviet Union's second-largest city, Leningrad. Stalin orders the Volga Germans deported to Siberia.
 September 11
 WWII: Charles Lindbergh, at an America First Committee rally in Des Moines, Iowa, accuses "the British, the Jewish, and the Roosevelt administration" of leading the United States toward war. Widespread condemnation of Lindbergh follows.
 The Medvedev Forest massacre of political prisoners takes place, at the Oryol Prison in the Soviet Union. 
 September 12
 WWII: The first snowfall is reported on the Russian front.
 Construction on The Pentagon begins in Washington, D.C.
 Franklin Roosevelt gives one of his fireside chats, on the USS Greer incident.
 September 14 – The State of Vermont "declares war" on Germany, by defining the United States to be in "armed conflict", in order to extend a wartime bonus to Vermonters in the service.
 September 15 – The Estonian Self-Administration, headed by Hjalmar Mäe, is appointed by the German military administration.
 September 16 – Rezā Shāh of Iran is forced to resign in favor of his son Mohammad Reza Pahlavi, under pressure from the United Kingdom and the Soviet Union, concluding the Anglo-Soviet invasion of Iran.
 September 16–30 – The Nikolaev massacre takes place in Mykolaiv (Soviet Union); 35,782 men, women and children, mostly Jews, are killed by Einsatzgruppe D and local collaborators.
 September 22 – The town of Reshetylivka in the Soviet Union is occupied by German forces.
 September 23 – The 1941 Texas hurricane makes landfall near Bay City, Texas, causing extensive damage and flooding in Galveston and Houston.
 September 27
 WWII: The National Liberation Front (Greece) (the main Greek Resistance movement) is established, and Georgios Siantos is appointed its first acting leader.
 September 28 – WWII: The Drama Uprising against the Bulgarian occupation in northern Greece begins.
 September 29 – WWII: The Moscow Conference begins; U.S. representative Averell Harriman and British representative Lord Beaverbrook meet with Soviet foreign minister Vyacheslav Molotov, to arrange urgent assistance for Russia.
 September 29–30 – The Holocaust: Babi Yar massacre – German troops, assisted by Ukrainian police and local collaborators, kill 33,771 Jews in Kyiv.

October

 Mid-October – The first P-38E Lightning fighter is produced by Lockheed in the United States.
 October 1
 The Holocaust: The Nazi German Majdanek concentration camp (Konzentrationslager Lublin) opens in occupied Poland, on the outskirts of the town of Lublin. Between October 1941 and July 1944, at least 200,000 people will be killed in the camp.
 The New Zealand Division of the Royal Navy becomes the Royal New Zealand Navy.
 October 2
 WWII: Operation Typhoon begins, as Germany launches an all-out offensive against Moscow.
 Tudeh Party of Iran is founded.
 October 5 – The Holocaust: In Berdychiv, 20–30,000 Jews are shot dead.
 October 7 – John Curtin becomes the 14th Prime Minister of Australia, following the defeat of Arthur Fadden's Country/UAP Coalition Government, on the floor of the House of Representatives.
 October 8 – WWII: In their invasion of the Soviet Union, Germany reaches the Sea of Azov, with the capture of Mariupol.
 October 11 – WWII: Armed insurgents from the People's Liberation Army of Macedonia attack Axis-occupied zones in the city of Prilep, beginning the National Liberation War of Macedonia.
 October 11–12 – Fire destroys a Firestone Tire and Rubber Company plant in Fall River, Massachusetts, consuming 15,850 tons of rubber, and causing a setback to the United States military effort.
 October 13 – The Holocaust: Heinrich Himmler instructs SS and Police Leader Odilo Globocnik to begin construction of Bełżec, the first of the Operation Reinhard extermination camps.
 October 15 – WWII: British submarine  bombards the port of Apollonia, Cyrenaica in Italian Libya.
 October 16 – WWII: The Soviet government moves to Kuibyshev (modern Samara), but Stalin remains in Moscow.
 October 17 – WWII: Destroyer  is torpedoed and damaged near Iceland, killing 11 sailors (the first American military casualties of the war, in which the US is at this time neutral).
 October 18 – General Hideki Tōjō becomes the 40th Prime Minister of Japan.
 October 18 – Film The Maltese Falcon is released in the United States, starring Humphrey Bogart and directed by John Huston.
 October 21
 WWII: Kragujevac massacre – German soldiers and local auxiliaries massacre more than 2,000 civilian men at Kragujevac, in Nazi-occupied Serbia.
 Fictional superheroine Wonder Woman, created by William Moulton Marston and H. G. Peter, makes her first appearance in All Star Comics #8, "Introducing Wonder Woman", in the US (cover date December 1941).
 October 23 – Walt Disney's fourth animated film Dumbo is released in the United States.
 October 25 – WWII: German fighter pilot Franz von Werra disappears during a flight over the North Sea.
 October 29 – The Holocaust: Kaunas massacre of October 29, 1941 – Over 9,200 Lithuanian Jews are shot dead.
 October 30
 WWII: Franklin D. Roosevelt, President of the United States, approves US$1 billion in Lend-Lease aid to the Soviet Union.
 The Holocaust: 1,500 Jews from Pidhaitsi (in western Ukraine) are sent by the Nazis to the Bełżec extermination camp.
 October 31
 WWII: Destroyer , on convoy escort, is accidentally torpedoed by a German U-boat near Iceland, killing more than 100 United States Navy sailors.
 The last day of carving on Mount Rushmore in South Dakota.

November

 November 5 – WWII: The United States holds peace talks with Japan.
 November 6 – WWII: Soviet leader Joseph Stalin addresses the Soviet Union for only the second time during his three-decade rule (the first time was earlier this year on July 2). He states that 350,000 Soviet troops have been killed in German attacks, but that the Germans have lost 4.5 million soldiers (a gross exaggeration), and that Soviet victory is near.
 November 7 – WWII: The Soviet hospital ship Armenia is sunk by German aircraft while evacuating refugees, wounded military and the staff of several Crimean hospitals. It is estimated that more than 5,000 die in the sinking.
 November 10 – In a speech at the Mansion House, London, Winston Churchill promises "should the United States become involved in war with Japan, the British declaration will follow within the hour".
 November 12 – WWII: 
 As the Battle of Moscow begins, temperatures around Moscow drop to −12 °C, and the Soviet Union launches ski troops for the first time, against the freezing German forces near the city.
 Soviet cruiser Chervona Ukraina is hit three times in the Severnaya Bay by bombs from German Junkers Ju 87 Stuka dive bombers from II./StG 77 during the Siege of Sevastopol.
 November 14
 The Holocaust: In Slonim (Byelorussian SSR), German forces engaged in Operation Barbarossa murder 9,000 Jews.
 November 17 – WWII: Joseph Grew, the United States ambassador to Japan, cables to Washington, D.C. a warning, that Japan may strike suddenly and unexpectedly.
 November 18 – WWII: Operation Crusader, a British Eighth Army operation to relieve the Siege of Tobruk in North Africa, begins.
 November 19 – WWII: Battle between HMAS Sydney and German auxiliary cruiser Kormoran – Both commerce raiding German auxiliary cruiser Kormoran and Australian cruiser  sink following a battle off the coast of Western Australia. There are no survivors from the 645 Australian sailors aboard Sydney.
 November 21 – The live blues radio program King Biscuit Time is broadcast for the first time on KFFA in Helena, Arkansas; it will attain its 17,000th broadcast in 2014 making it the longest-running daily American radio broadcast.
 November 22 – WWII: British heavy cruiser  sinks commerce raiding , ending the longest warship cruise of the war (622 days without in-port replenishment or repair).
 November 26 – WWII: 
 The Hull note (Outline of Proposed Basis for Agreement Between the United States and Japan), named for Secretary of State Cordell Hull, is delivered to the Empire of Japan by the United States.
 A task force of 6 aircraft carriers, commanded by Japanese Vice Admiral Chūichi Nagumo, leaves Hitokapu Bay for Pearl Harbor, under strict radio silence.
 November 27
 WWII: Germans reach their closest approach to Moscow. They are subsequently frozen by cold weather and stopped by attacks by the Soviets.
 A group of young men stop traffic on U.S. Highway 99 south of Yreka, California, handing out fliers proclaiming the establishment of the State of Jefferson.
 November 30 and December 8 – Rumbula massacre: Nazi forces kill approximately 24,000 Latvian Jews and 1,000 German Jews outside of Riga.

December

 December 1 – WWII:
 Fiorello La Guardia, Mayor of New York City and Director of the Office of Civilian Defense, signs Administrative Order 9, creating the Civil Air Patrol under the authority of the United States Army Air Forces.
 A state of emergency is declared in British Malaya and the Straits Settlements.
 December 2 – WWII: The code message "Climb Mount Niitaka" is transmitted to the Japanese task force, indicating that negotiations have broken down and that the attack on Pearl Harbor is to be carried out according to plan.
 December 4 – The State of Jefferson is declared in Yreka, California, with a judge, John Childs, as governor.
 December 5 – WWII: The United Kingdom declares war on Finland, Hungary and Romania.
 December 6 – WWII:
 Soviet counterattacks begin against German troops encircling Moscow.
 British submarine  is mined off Cephalonia.
 December 7 (December 8 – 3:18 a.m., Japan Standard Time) – WWII:
 Attack on Pearl Harbor: Aircraft flying from Imperial Japanese Navy carriers launch a surprise attack on the United States fleet at Pearl Harbor in Hawaii, thus drawing the United States into World War II. The attack begins at 7:55 a.m. Hawaiian Standard Time, and is announced on radio stations in the U.S. at about 11:26 p.m. PST (19.26 GMT).
 The Japanese declaration of war on the United States and the British Empire is published in Japanese evening newspapers, but not formally delivered to the U.S. until the following day. Canada declares war on Japan.
 Adolf Hitler makes his Nacht und Nebel decree, declaring that all political prisoners and those involved in both German resistance to Nazism and resistance to Nazism throughout German-occupied Europe are to be apprehended by the Gestapo, Sicherheitsdienst and other security forces under Heinrich Himmler's control.
 Tobruk's British and Commonwealth garrison is relieved after Axis forces under Rommel withdraw.
 December 8 
 WWII: The Battle of Hong Kong begins shortly after 8:00 a.m. (local time), less than 8 hours after the attack on Pearl Harbor, when Japanese forces invade Hong Kong, which is defended by British, Canadian and local troops. The United Kingdom officially declares war on the Empire of Japan.
 WWII: The Japanese Invade Shanghai International Settlement, to occupy the British and the American sectors, after the attack on Pearl Harbor.
 WWII: The Japanese invasion of the Philippines begins 10 hours after the attack on Pearl Harbor, when Japanese forces invade Luzon and destroy U.S. aircraft on Clark Field.
 WWII: President of the United States Franklin D. Roosevelt delivers his "Infamy Speech" to a Joint session of the United States Congress at 12:30 p.m. EST (17.30 GMT). Transmitted live over all four major national networks, it attracts the largest audience ever for an American radio broadcast, over 81% of homes. Within an hour, Congress agrees to the President's request for a United States declaration of war upon Japan, and he signs it at 4:10 p.m.
 WWII: Australia, New Zealand, The Netherlands, the Free French, Yugoslavia, Costa Rica, Cuba, El Salvador, Guatemala and Honduras also officially declare war on Japan, and the Republic of China declares war on the Axis powers.
 WWII: Japanese forces attack British Malaya and Thailand.
 WWII: The German advance on Moscow (Operation Typhoon) is suspended for the winter.
 The Holocaust: The Nazi German Chełmno extermination camp opens in occupied Poland, near the village of Chełmno nad Nerem. Between December 1941-April 1943 and June 1944-January 1945, at least 153,000 Jews will be killed in the camp.
 The Holocaust The first mass gassing of Jews begins at the Chełmno extermination camp on December 8, 1941, when the Nazis use gas vans to murder people from the Lodz ghetto.
 December 10 – WWII: 
British battleship  and battlecruiser HMS Repulse are sunk by Japanese aircraft in the South China Sea north of Singapore.
The Provisional Government of the Republic of Korea officially declares war on Japan.
 December 11 – WWII:
 Germany and Italy declare war on the United States. The U.S. responds in kind.
 Mildred Gillars ("Axis Sally") delivers her first propaganda broadcast to Allied troops.
 December 11–13 – WWII: Battle of Jitra: Japanese compel British troops to withdraw from their positions in Malaya.
 December 12 – WWII:
 Hungary and Romania declare war on the United States.
 British India declares war on the Empire of Japan.
 The United States seizes the French liner .
 The Kimura Detachment of the Japanese Imperial forces occupies Legaspi, Albay, Philippines.
 December 13
 WWII: The United Kingdom, New Zealand and South Africa declare war on Bulgaria; Hungary declares war on the United States; and Honduras declares war on Germany and Italy.
 WWII: The Battle of Cape Bon Is fought off Cape Bon, Tunisia: Italian cruisers Alberico da Barbiano and Alberto da Giussano are sunk without loss to the Allies.
 Sweden's low temperature record of −53 °C is set in a village within the Vilhelmina Municipality.
 December 14 – WWII: The Independent State of Croatia declares war on the United States and the United Kingdom.
 December 15 – WWII: At Drobytsky Yar, 15,000 Jews are shot dead by German troops.
 December 19 – WWII: 
 Hitler becomes Supreme Commander-in-Chief of the Nazi Army.
 Raid on Alexandria: Italian Regia Marina divers on human torpedoes place limpet mines on ships of the British Royal Navy Mediterranean Fleet in port at Alexandria, Egypt, disabling battleships Queen Elizabeth and Valiant.
 Twelve days after the Japanese raid on Pearl Harbor, the United States Naval Academy in Annapolis, Maryland graduates its "Class of 1942" a semester early, so as to induct the graduating students without delay into the U.S. Navy and/or Marine Corps as officers, for immediate stationing in the war. 
 December 21
 Thailand and Japan sign a military alliance.
 The Holocaust: The Stanisławów Ghetto is established.
 December 22 – WWII: The Arcadia Conference opens in Washington, D.C., the first meeting on military strategy between the heads of government of the United Kingdom and the United States, following the latter's entry into the war.
 December 23 – WWII: A second Japanese landing attempt on Wake Island is successful, and the American garrison surrenders, after a full night and morning of fighting.
 December 24 – WWII:
 British forces capture Benghazi.
 Dutch submarine HNLMS K XVI is the first Allied ship to sink a Japanese warship, sinking the destroyer Sagiri near Sarawak;  K XVI is herself torpedoed the following day by Japanese submarine I-66.
 December 25 – WWII:
 The Battle of Hong Kong ends after 17 days, with the surrender of the British Crown colony to the Japanese.
 Admiral Émile Muselier seizes the archipelago of Saint Pierre and Miquelon off Newfoundland, the first part of France to be liberated by the Free French Forces.
 December 26 – WWII: Winston Churchill becomes the first British Prime Minister to address a joint session of the United States Congress.
 December 27 – WWII: British Commandos raid the Norwegian port of Vaagso, causing Hitler to reinforce the garrison and defenses, drawing vital troops away from other areas.

Date unknown
 The Classic Comics series is launched in the United States, with a version of The Three Musketeers.
 Chosun Tire and Rubber Manufacture, predecessor of South Korean tire brand Hankook, is founded in a suburb of Seoul (at this time part of the Empire of Japan).
 Factory Canteen, predecessor of Compass Group, global license food service and contract caterer, is founded in England.

Births

January

 January 1
 Asrani, Indian actor and director
 Dardo Cabo, Argentine journalist, activist (d. 1977)
 Martin Evans, British biologist, Nobel Prize in Physiology or Medicine laureate
 Abdiqasim Salad Hassan, Somali politician, 5th President of Somalia
 January 3 – Shima Iwashita, Japanese actress
 January 4
 Maureen Reagan, American political activist (d. 2001)
 John Bennett Perry, American actor, singer and former model
 January 5
 Harvey Hall, American businessman, politician (d. 2018) 
 Chuck McKinley, American tennis player (d. 1986)
 Hayao Miyazaki, Japanese film director, screenwriter
 Mansoor Ali Khan Pataudi, Indian cricketer (d. 2011)
 January 7
 Iona Brown, British violinist, conductor (d. 2004)
 Frederick D. Gregory, African-American astronaut
 John E. Walker, British chemist, Nobel Prize laureate
 January 8 
 Graham Chapman, British comedian (Monty Python's Flying Circus) (d. 1989)
 Boris Vallejo, Peruvian painter
 January 9 
 Joan Baez, American singer, songwriter and activist
 Reza Sheikholeslami, Professor of Persian Studies (d. 2018)
 January 10 – José Greci, Italian actress (d. 2017)
 January 11
 Dave Edwards, American musician (d. 2000)
 Gérson, Brazilian footballer
 Pak Seung-zin, North Korean footballer (d. 2011)
 Jimmy Velvit, American singer/songwriter
 January 12 – Long John Baldry, English singer (d. 2005)
 January 13 – Pasqual Maragall, Spanish politician
 January 14
 Faye Dunaway, American actress
 Milan Kučan, Slovenian politician, 1st President of Slovenia
 January 15 – Captain Beefheart, American singer (d. 2010)
 January 17 – Mircea Snegur, 1st President of Moldova
 January 18 
 Bobby Goldsboro, American pop and country singer-songwriter
 David Ruffin, African-American singer (The Temptations) (d. 1991)
 January 19 – Pat Patterson, Canadian professional wrestler
 January 20
 Clift Tsuji, American politician (d. 2016)
 Allan Young, English footballer (d. 2009)
 January 21 
 Plácido Domingo, Spanish opera singer, conductor and arts administrator
 Richie Havens, African-American musician (d. 2013)
 Ivan Putski, Polish-American professional wrestler and bodybuilder
 January 22 – Rintaro, Japanese anime director
 January 24
 Neil Diamond, American singer, songwriter
 Aaron Neville, African-American singer
 Dan Shechtman, Israeli chemist, Nobel Prize laureate
 January 27 
 Bobby Hutcherson, African-American jazz musician (d. 2016)
 Beatrice Tinsley, English astronomer (d. 1981)
 January 28 – Fernando Serena, Spanish footballer (d. 2018)
 January 29 – Robin Morgan, Poet, author, political theorist, activist, journalist, lecturer, and editor
 January 30
 Gregory Benford, American author and astrophysicist
 Delbert Mann, American television, film director (d. 2007)
 Tineke Lagerberg, Dutch swimmer
 Dick Cheney, 46th Vice President of the United States
 January 31
 Dick Gephardt, American politician 
 Eugène Terre'Blanche, South African farmer, pro-apartheid activist (d. 2010)
 Jessica Walter, American actress (d. 2021)

February

 February 1
 Karl Dall, German comedian, singer and television presenter
 Jerry Spinelli, American author
 February 3
 Dory Funk Jr., American professional wrestler
 Howard Phillips, American politician (d. 2013)
 February 4 
 Laisenia Qarase, Fijian politician (d. 2020)
 John Steel, English drummer
 February 5
 Stephen J. Cannell, American director, producer (d. 2010)
 Henson Cargill, American country music singer (d. 2007)
 David Selby, American actor
 Barrett Strong, American Motown singer-songwriter (d. 2023)
 Kaspar Villiger, Swiss politician
 Cory Wells, American rock singer (Three Dog Night) (d. 2015)
 February 6 – Stephen Albert, American composer (d. 1992)
 February 8
 Nick Nolte, American actor
 Jagjit Singh, Indian singer, composer and musician (d. 2011)
 February 9 — Kermit Gosnell, American abortionist and serial killer
 February 10 – Michael Apted, British film director (d. 2021)
 February 11 
 Sergio Mendes, Brazilian jazz musician
 Sonny Landham, American actor (d. 2017)
 February 12 
 Hubert Marcoux, Canadian solo sailor and author (d. 2009)
 Naomi Uemura, Japanese adventurer (d. 1984)
 February 13
 Sigmar Polke, German painter
 Bo Svenson, Swedish-American actor
 February 15 – Florinda Bolkan, Brazilian actress and model
 February 16 – Kim Jong-il, Leader of the Democratic People's Republic of Korea (d. 2011)
 February 17 – Ron Meyer, American football coach (d. 2017)
 February 18 – Irma Thomas, African-American singer
 February 19 – David Gross, American physicist, Nobel Prize laureate
 February 20 – Buffy Sainte-Marie, Canadian singer
 February 22 
 Hipólito Mejía, President of the Dominican Republic (2000-2004)
 Yau Leung, Hong Kong photographer (d. 1997)
 February 27 – Paddy Ashdown, British politician, diplomat (d. 2018)

March

 March 4 
 Richard Benjamin Harrison, American businessman, reality TV star (d. 2018)
 Adrian Lyne, English film director
 March 7 – Andrei Mironov, Soviet and Russian theatre and film actor (d. 1987)
 March 9 – Ernesto Miranda, American criminal (d. 1976)
 March 10 – George P. Smith, American biochemist, Nobel Prize laureate
 March 12 – Erkki Salmenhaara, Finnish composer (d. 2002)
 March 13 – Mahmoud Darwish, Palestinian poet and author (d. 2008)
 March 14 – Wolfgang Petersen, German film director (d. 2022)
 March 15 – Mike Love, American musician (Beach Boys) 
 March 16
 Bernardo Bertolucci, Italian film director (d. 2018)
 Robert Guéï, military ruler of Côte d'Ivoire (d. 2002)
 Chuck Woolery, American game show host
 March 17 – Paul Kantner, American rock guitarist (Jefferson Airplane) (d. 2016)
 March 18 – Wilson Pickett, African-American singer (d. 2006)
 March 20 – Kenji Kimihara, Japanese long-distance runner
 March 21 – Dirk Frimout, Belgian cosmonaut and astrophysicist
 March 22 – Bruno Ganz, Swiss actor (d. 2019)
 March 23 – Jim Trelease, American educator, author
 March 26 – Richard Dawkins, British scientist
 March 27
 Ivan Gašparovič, 3rd President of Slovakia
 Bunny Sigler, American singer, songwriter and record producer (d. 2017)
 March 28
 Alf Clausen, American composer
 Philip Fang, Hong Kong simultaneous interpretation specialist, United Nations official (d. 2013)
 Jim Turner, American football player
 Rolf Zacher, German actor (d. 2018)
 Jaime Pardo Leal, Colombian lawyer, union leader, and politician (d. 1987)
 March 29 – Joseph Hooton Taylor Jr., American astrophysicist, Nobel Prize laureate
 March 30 
 Graeme Edge, British rock drummer, songwriter (The Moody Blues)
 Wasim Sajjad, President of Pakistan
 March 31 – Rosario Green, Mexican economist, diplomat and politician (d. 2017)

April

 April 2 – Dr. Demento (Barret Eugene Hansen), American radio disc jockey, novelty music collector
 April 3
 Jan Berry, American singer (Jan & Dean) (d. 2004)
 Eric Braeden, German-born American actor
 Jorma Hynninen, Finnish baritone
 Philippé Wynne, American musician (d. 1984)
 April 5
 Michael Moriarty, American-Canadian actor
 Dave Swarbrick, English folk musician (d. 2016)
 April 6 – Phil Austin, American comedian (The Firesign Theater) (d. 2015)
 April 7
 Mussum, Brazilian actor and musician (d. 1994)
 Cornelia Frances, Australian actress (d. 2018)
 Gorden Kaye, British actor ('Allo 'Allo!) (d. 2017)
 ʻAkilisi Pōhiva, Tongan politician and activist, 15th Prime Minister of Tonga (d. 2019)
 April 8 – Peggy Lennon, American singer (The Lennon Sisters)
 April 9 – Kay Adams, American country singer
 April 10 
 John Kurila, Scottish footballer (d. 2018)
 Paul Theroux, American travel writer and novelist
 April 11 
 Frederick Hauck, American astronaut
 Shirley Stelfox, English actress (d. 2015)
 April 12 – Bobby Moore, English football player, World Cup winning captain (d. 1993)
 April 13 – Michael Stuart Brown, American geneticist, recipient of the Nobel Prize in Physiology or Medicine
 April 14 – Pete Rose, American baseball player
 April 18 – Michael D. Higgins, 9th President of Ireland
 April 19
 Roberto Carlos, Brazilian singer-songwriter
 Jürgen Kocka, German historian
 April 20 – Ryan O'Neal, American actor (Love Story)
 April 21 – Eduardo Guedes, U.S., Portuguese film-maker (d. 2000)
 April 22 – Amir Pnueli, Israeli computer scientist (d. 2009)
 April 23
 Arie den Hartog, Dutch road bicycle racer (d. 2018)
 Paavo Lipponen, 59th Prime Minister of Finland
 Ed Stewart, British disc jockey (d. 2016)
 Ray Tomlinson, American computer programmer (d. 2016)
 April 24
 Richard Holbrooke, American diplomat (d. 2010)
 John Williams, Australian guitarist
 April 25 
 Princess Muna al-Hussein, Princess consort of Jordan
 Bertrand Tavernier, French director, screenwriter, actor and producer
 April 26 – Claudine Auger, French actress (d. 2019)
 April 27
 Pat Choate, American economist, politician
 H. Tristram Engelhardt Jr., American philosopher (d. 2018) 
 Lee Roy Jordan, American football player
 April 28
 Lucien Aimar, French cyclist
 Ann-Margret, Swedish-born American actress, singer and dancer
 K. Barry Sharpless, American chemist, double Nobel Prize laureate
 Iryna Zhylenko, Ukrainian poet (d. 2013)

May

 May 3 
 Paul Ferris, English film composer, actor (d. 1995)
 Kornel Morawiecki, Polish politician and theoretical physicist (d. 2019)
 May 5 
 Anatoly Levchenko, Soviet cosmonaut (d. 1988)
 Alexander Ragulin, Russian hockey player (d. 2004)
 May 6
 Peter Corrigan, Australian architect (d. 2016) 
 Ivica Osim, Bosnian football player, manager
 May 8
 James Mitchum, American actor
 Yuri Voronov, Abkhazian politician, academic (murdered) (d. 1995)
 May 9 – Howard Komives, American professional basketball player (d. 2009)
 May 10
Taurean Blacque, American television and stage actor (d. 2022)
Chris Denning, English radio presenter and convicted sex offender
Aydın Güven Gürkan, Turkish academic, politician (d. 2006)
 May 11 – Eric Burdon, British singer 
 May 13
 Senta Berger, Austrian actress
 Ritchie Valens, American singer (La Bamba) (d. 1959)
 May 14 – Jesús Gómez, Mexican equestrian (d. 2017)
 May 16 
 Aldrich Ames, American CIA analyst and KGB agent
 Eric Berntson, Canadian politician (d. 2018)
 May 18 – Miriam Margolyes, British-Australian actress
 May 19
 Peter C. Bjarkman, American baseball historian, author (d. 2018)
 Bobby Burgess, American dancer, singer
 Nora Ephron, American film producer, director, and screenwriter (d. 2012)
 May 20 – Goh Chok Tong, 2nd Prime Minister of Singapore
 May 21 – Bobby Cox, American baseball manager
 May 22 – Menzies Campbell, British politician
 May 23
 K. Raghavendra Rao, Indian film director, producer, screenwriter and choreographer
 Rod Thorn, American basketball player, coach, and executive
 May 24
 Andrés García, Dominican-Mexican actor 
 Bob Dylan, American poet, musician and recipient of the Nobel Prize in Literature
 May 25 – Rudolf Adler, Czech filmmaker
 Vladimir Voronin, 3rd President of Moldova
 May 26 – John Kaufman, British sculptor
 May 27 
 Ira Berlin, American historian (d. 2018)
 Teppo Hauta-aho, Finnish double bassist, composer
 May 29 – Doug Scott, English mountaineer
 May 31
 Louis Ignarro, American pharmacologist, recipient of the Nobel Prize in Physiology or Medicine
 William Nordhaus, American economist, recipient of the Nobel Memorial Prize in Economic Sciences

June

 June 1
Wayne Kemp, American country music singer (d. 2015)
 Jigjidiin Mönkhbat, Mongolian wrestler (d. 2018)
 Alexander V. Zakharov, Soviet and Russian astronomer
 June 2
 Stacy Keach, American actor
 Charlie Watts, English musician (d. 2021)
 June 5
 Martha Argerich, Argentine pianist
 Spalding Gray, American actor, screenwriter (d. 2004)
 Robert Kraft, American businessman
 June 6 – Alexander Cockburn, Irish-American political journalist and writer (d. 2012)
 June 7 
 Tony Ray-Jones, British photographer (d. 1972)
 Jaime Laredo, Bolivian-American violinist and conductor
 June 8
 Robert Bradford, Northern Irish politician (murdered in 1981)
 Fuzzy Haskins, American musician 
 George Pell, Australian cardinal (d. 2023)
 June 9 – Jon Lord, English composer, pianist and organist (d. 2012)
 June 10
 Jürgen Prochnow, German actor
Aida Vedishcheva, Soviet and Russian singer
 June 12
 Marv Albert, American sports announcer
 Chick Corea, American jazz pianist (d. 2021)
 Reg Presley, English musician (d. 2013)
 June 13 – Esther Ofarim, Israeli singer
 June 14
 Roy Harper, English guitarist
 John Edgar Wideman, African-American novelist, author and professor
 June 15
 Neal Adams, American comic book artist
 Harry Nilsson, American musician (d. 1994)
 June 17 – Roberta Maxwell, Canadian actress
 June 19
 Gilberto Benetton, Italian billionaire businessman (d. 2018)
 Conchita Carpio-Morales, Filipino Supreme Court jurist
 Václav Klaus, 2nd President of the Czech Republic
 June 20 
 Ulf Merbold, German astronaut and physicist
 Albert Shesternyov, Soviet footballer (d. 1994)
 June 21
Mitty Collier, American church pastor and gospel (previously rhythm and blues) singer
 Aloysius Paul D'Souza, Bishop of the Roman Catholic Diocese of Mangalore
 Joe Flaherty, American-Canadian actor, comedian (Second City Television)
 Liz Mohn, German businesswoman in management of media conglomerate Bertelsmann, widow of Reinhard Mohn
 Totto Osvold, Norwegian radio entertainer
 Jimmy Rayl, American basketball player (d. 2019)
 Eduardo Suplicy, Brazilian left-wing politician, economist and professor
 Valeri Zolotukhin, Soviet and Russian actor (d. 2013)
 June 22
 Ed Bradley, African-American journalist (60 Minutes) (d. 2006)
 Howard Kindig, American football player 
 Michael Lerner, American actor
 Terttu Savola, Finnish politician
 June 23
 Robert Hunter, American lyricist, singer-songwriter, translator and poet (d. 2019)
 Madampu Kunjukuttan, Malayalam author (d. 2021)
 Tsai Hsun-hsiung, Taiwanese politician
 June 24
 Erkin Koray, Turkish musician
 Julia Kristeva, Bulgarian-French philosopher, literary critic, psychoanalyst, feminist and novelist
 Nelson López, Argentine football defender
 Graham McKenzie, Australian cricketer
 Bill Reardon, American politician, educator
 Charles Whitman, American mass murderer (d. 1966)
 June 25
 Denys Arcand, French-Canadian film director, screenwriter and producer
 Miles Feinstein, American criminal law defense attorney, legal commentator
 Eddie Large, British comedian (d. 2020)
 Kenneth Walker, Australian cricketer
 June 26 
 Gil Garrido, Panamanian baseball player 
 Nick Macarchuk, American basketball head coach
 Tamara Moskvina, Russian competitive skater and pair skating coach
 Thomas Yeh Sheng-nan, Taiwanese prelate
 June 27 
 Jerry Allen, American football running back
 Ian Black, British competitive swimmer
 John Goold, Australian rules footballer
 James P. Hogan, British author (d. 2010)
 Mike Honda, American politician and educator
 Krzysztof Kieślowski, Polish film director (d. 1996)
 Pavel Schenk, Czech volleyball player
 John Smyth, British barrister
 June 28 
 Ilana Adir, Israeli Olympic runner and long jumper
 César Bejarano, Paraguayan fencer
 Len Boehmer, American Major League Baseball player
 Joseph Goguen, American computer scientist (d. 2006)
 David Johnston, 28th Governor General of Canada
 Barbara Stolz, German gymnast
 June 29
 Chieko Baisho, Japanese actress, singer
 John Boccabella, American baseball player
 David A. Bramlett, United States Army four-star general
 Stokely Carmichael (later Kwame Ture), Trinidadian-American civil rights activist (d. 1998)
 Margitta Gummel, German Olympic gold medalist
 Larry Stahl, American baseball player
 June 30 
 Cyril Atanassoff, French-born Bulgarian ballet dancer
 Roberto Castrillo, Cuban sports shooter
 Mike Leander, English arranger, songwriter and record producer (d. 1996)
 Otto Sander, German actor (d. 2013)
 Nigel Walley, English golfer, tea-chest bass player

July

 July 1
 Alf Duval, Australian rower
 Rod Gilbert, Canadian professional ice hockey forward
 Alfred G. Gilman, American scientist, recipient of the Nobel Prize in Physiology or Medicine (d. 2015)
 Ursula Koch, Swiss politician
 Jaakko Kailajärvi, Finnish weightlifter
 Twyla Tharp, American dancer, choreographer, and author
 Zimani Kadzamira, Malawian academic, civil servant and diplomat
 Denis Michael Rohan, Australian citizen who, on August 21, 1969, set fire to the pulpit of the Al-Aqsa Mosque, in Jerusalem (d. 1995)
 Nicolae Saramandu, Romanian linguist and philologist
 Myron Scholes, Canadian-American financial economist
 July 2
 Mogens Frey, Danish amateur cyclist
 Chris Noel, American actress
 Stéphane Venne, French-Canadian songwriter, composer
 July 3 
 Gloria Allred, American lawyer
 Casey Cox, American baseball player 
 Adoor Gopalakrishnan, Indian film director, screenwriter, and producer
 Hertha Haase, German swimmer
 Liamine Zéroual, 4th President of Algeria
 July 4
 Jay Carty, American basketball player (d. 2017)
 Sergio Oliva, Cuban bodybuilder (d. 2012)
 Digger Phelps, American former college basketball coach
 July 5 
 Lynley Dodd, New Zealand writer and illustrator 
 Peggy Miley, American actress, writer
 Epeli Nailatikau, Fijian chief, 4th President of Fiji
 July 6 
 John DeCamp, American politician (d. 2017)
 Randall Robinson, African-American lawyer, author and activist
 Harold Leighton Weller, American conductor
 July 7 
 Vivian Barbot, Canadian-Haitian teacher, activist, and politician
 Marco Bollesan, Italian former rugby union player, coach and manager
 Alan Durban, Welsh international footballer, manager
 Louis Friedman, American astronautics engineer, space spokesperson
 Michael Howard, Welsh politician
 Bill Oddie, English writer, composer, musician and comedian
 John Fru Ndi, Cameroonian politician
 Jim Rodford, English musician (d. 2018)
 July 8
 Dario Gradi, Italia amateur football player, coach and manager
 Thunderbolt Patterson, American professional wrestler
 Ken Sanders, American Major League Baseball relief pitcher
 July 9
 Cirilo Bautista, Filipino poet, fictionist, critic and writer of nonfiction
 Tom Black, American professional basketball player
 Jan Lehane, Australian female tennis player 
 Hans-Gunnar Liljenwall, Swedish modern pentathlete
 Takehide Nakatani Japanese lightweight judoka
 July 10 
 Jackie Lane, British actress
 Robert Pine, American actor
 July 11 
 John Kaputin, Papua New Guinean politician
 Clive Puzey, Southern Rhodesian racing driver
 Jürgen Schmidt, German speed skater
 Tommy Vance, British disc jockey (d. 2005)
 Rosa Morena, Spanish flamenco-pop singer and actress (d. 2019)
 July 12
 John Lahr, American drama critic
 Juha Väätäinen, Finnish athlete
 Wu Bangguo, Chinese politician
 Dick Rusteck, American left-handed pitcher
 Benny Parsons, American race car driver (d. 2007)
 July 13
 Affonso Beato, Brazilian cinematographer
 Robert Forster, American actor (d. 2019)
 Zoila Martínez, Dominican lawyer, prosecutor and diplomat
 Jacques Perrin, French actor and filmmaker (d. 2022)
 July 14
 Maulana Karenga, African-American author, activist; founder of Kwanzaa
 Dennis Kassian, Canadian professional ice hockey player
 Andreas Khol, Austrian politician
 July 15
 Archie Clark, American professional basketball player
 Vicente Guillot, Spanish footballer
 Nikhil Kumar, Indian politician
 July 16
 Valeri Butenko, Soviet midfielder, football referee
 Desmond Dekker, Jamaican singer and songwriter (d. 2006)
 Ken Herock, American college, professional football player
 Seijirō Kōyama, Japanese film director
 Kálmán Mészöly, Hungarian football (soccer) player, coach
 Lloyd Sisco, American football coach
 Hans Wiegel, Dutch politician
 July 17
 Namirembe Bitamazire, Ugandan academic, politician
 Marina Oswald Porter, Russian-born widow of JFK assassin Lee Harvey Oswald
 Morimichi Takagi, Japanese baseball player (d. 2020)
 Rob van Empel, Dutch breaststroke swimmer
 July 18
 Winston Choo, Singaporean diplomat, civil servant and former general
 Frank Farian, German record producer, songwriter
 Marcia Jones-Smoke, American sprint canoer
 Lonnie Mack, American singer, guitarist (d. 2016) 
 Martha Reeves, African-American singer
 Duncan Worsley, British cricketer
 July 19
 Carlos Alberto Álvarez, Argentine cyclist
 Natalia Bessmertnova, Russian ballerina (d. 2008)
 Vikki Carr, American singer
 Neelie Kroes, Dutch politician
 Vittorio Di Prima, Italian actor and voice actor (d. 2016)
 July 20
 Vladimir Lyakhov, Ukrainian-Soviet cosmonaut (d. 2018)
 Frank Natterer, German mathematician
 Vladimir Veber, Moldovan footballer 
 July 21
 Diogo Freitas do Amaral, Portuguese politician, 110th Prime Minister of Portugal (d. 2019)
 Ron Corry, Australian football (soccer) player, coach
 Gary Waslewski, American baseball player
 July 22 
 George Clinton, African-American musician
 Rich Jackson, American football player
 Susie Berning, American professional golfer
 July 23 – Sergio Mattarella, Italian lawyer, judge and politician, 12th President of Italy
 July 25
 Margarita Isabel, Mexican actress (d. 2017)
 Nate Thurmond, African-American basketball player (d. 2016)
 Emmett Till, African-American civil rights icon (d. 1955)
 July 26 – Darlene Love, African-American singer, actress
 July 27 – Bill Baxley, Alabama politician
 July 28 
 Peter Cullen, Canadian voice actor
 Riccardo Muti, Italian conductor
 July 29 – Jennifer Dunn, American politician (d. 2007)
 July 30 – Paul Anka, Canadian-American singer, songwriter

August

 August 2 – Ede Staal, Dutch singer-songwriter (d. 1986)
 August 3 
 Martha Stewart, American television personality, media entrepreneur
 Hage Geingob, 1st Prime Minister of Namibia, 3rd President of Namibia
 August 4
 Martin Jarvis, English actor and voice actor
 Ted Strickland, American politician
 August 5 – Gil Garcetti, American politician
 August 6 – Lyle Berman, American poker player
 August 8
 Earl Boen, American actor and voice actor (d. 2023)
 George Tiller, American physician (d. 2009)
Anri Jergenia, 4th Prime Minister of Abkhazia (d. 2020)
 August 9 – Shirlee Busbee, American novelist
 August 12 – Deborah Walley, American actress (d. 2001)
 August 14
 Aïcha Chenna, Moroccan women's rights activist (d. 2022)
 David Crosby, American musician (Crosby, Stills and Nash) (d. 2023)
 Connie Smith, American singer
 August 16
 Théoneste Bagosora, Rwandan army officer, alleged planner of the Rwandan genocide (d. 2021)
 David Dickinson, British antiques expert, television presenter
 August 17 
 Ibrahim Babangida, President of Nigeria
 Lothar Bisky, German politician (d. 2013)
 Fritz Wepper, German actor
 August 20 – Slobodan Milošević, 3rd President of Yugoslavia and 1st President of Serbia (d. 2006)
 August 21
 Howard Lew Lewis, English comedian, actor (d. 2018)
 Jackie DeShannon, American singer, songwriter ("What the World Needs Now")
 August 26 
 Akiko Wakabayashi, Japanese actress
 Ayşe Kulin, Turkish writer
 August 27 
 Cesária Évora, Cape Verdean singer (d. 2011)
 Yury Malyshev, Soviet cosmonaut (d. 1999)
 August 28 – A. I. Katsina-Alu, Nigerian judge (d. 2018)
 August 29 – Robin Leach, English television personality (d. 2018)

September

 September 2
 Graeme Langlands, Australian rugby league player (d. 2018)
 Jyrki Otila, Finnish quiz show judge, Member of the European Parliament (d. 2003)
 John Thompson, American basketball coach (d. 2020)
 September 3 – Sergei Dovlatov, Russian short-story writer, novelist (d. 1990)
 September 4 – Sushilkumar Shinde, Indian politician
 September 8
 Ito Giani, Italian sprinter (d. 2018)
 Bernie Sanders, American politician, U.S. Senator (D-Vt.), and 2016 presidential candidate
 Christopher Connelly, American actor (d. 1988)
 September 9
 Otis Redding, African-American singer, musician (Dock of the Bay) (d. 1967)
 Dennis Ritchie, American computer scientist, creator of the C programming language (d. 2011)
 September 10
 Christopher Hogwood, English conductor, harpsichordist (d. 2014)
 Gunpei Yokoi, Japanese computer game producer (d. 1997)
 September 13
 Tadao Ando, Japanese architect
 Ahmet Necdet Sezer, 10th President of Turkey
 September 14 – Alberto Naranjo, Venezuelan musician (d. 2020)
 September 15 
 Signe Toly Anderson, American singer (d. 2016)
 Etelka Barsi-Pataky, Hungarian politician (d. 2018)
 September 17 – Bob Matsui, U.S. Congressman from California (d. 2005)
 September 18 – Priscilla Mitchell, American country music singer (d. 2014)
 September 19 – Cass Elliot, American singer (The Mamas & the Papas) (d. 1974)
 September 20 – Dale Chihuly, American glass sculptor
 September 21 – R. James Woolsey Jr., American lawyer and diplomat
 September 23 – George Jackson, American author (d. 1971)
 September 24
 Jesús Mosterín, Spanish philosopher (d. 2017)
 Guy Hovis, American singer
 Linda McCartney, American activist, musician and photographer (d. 1998)
 September 26 – Martine Beswick, British actress, model
 September 27
 Gay Kayler Ashcroft, Australian country music singer
 Sam Zell, American publisher, investor
 September 28 – Edmund Stoiber, German politician 
 September 29 – Fred West, British serial killer (d. 1995)
 September 30 – Angela Pleasence, British actress

October

 October 1 – Vyacheslav Vedenin, Soviet cross-country skier
 October 3 – Chubby Checker, American singer (The Twist)
 October 4
 Mighty Shadow, Trinidadian calypsonian (d. 2018)
 Roy Blount Jr., American writer, comedian
 Elizabeth Eckford, African-American activist (Little Rock Nine)
 Anne Rice, American writer (d. 2021)
 October 5 – Eduardo Duhalde, 50th President of Argentina
 October 8 – Jesse Jackson, African-American clergyman, civil rights activist and presidential candidate
 October 9 – Trent Lott, American politician and author
 October 10 
 Peter Coyote, American actor
 Hanan Goldblatt, Israeli actor
 Ken Saro-Wiwa, Nigerian writer, television producer, and environmental activist (d. 1995)
 October 11 – Valerii Postoyanov, Soviet Olympic sport shooter (d. 2018)
 October 13 – Paul Simon, American singer, composer (Simon and Garfunkel)
 October 15 
 Rosie Douglas, 4th Prime Minister of Dominica (d. 2000)
 Joan Antoni Solans Huguet, Spanish urban planner (d. 2019)
 October 16 – Tim McCarver, American baseball player and sportscaster (d. 2023)
 October 17 – Earl Thomas Conley, American country music singer (d. 2019)
 October 19 – Peter Thornley, English professional wrestler best known for the ring character Kendo Nagasaki
 October 20 – Anneke Wills, British actress
 October 21 – Dickie Pride, British rock and roll singer (d. 1969)
 October 23 – Mel Winkler, American actor (d. 2020)
 October 24 – Frank Aendenboom, Belgian actor (d. 2018)
 October 25
 Helen Reddy, Australian singer, actress (I Am Woman)
 Anne Tyler, American novelist
 October 27 
 Gerd Brantenberg, Norwegian feminist author, gay rights activist
 Dick Trickle, American race car driver (d. 2013)
 October 28
 John Hallam, Irish actor
 Hank Marvin, British guitarist, singer and songwriter (The Shadows)
 October 30 – Theodor W. Hänsch, German physicist, Nobel Prize in Physics recipient
 October 31 – Sally Kirkland, American actress

November

 November 1
 Marina Baura, Spanish actress
 Nigel Dempster, British journalist, author, broadcaster and diarist (d. 2007)
 Robert Foxworth, American actor
 November 2 – Bruce Welch, British guitarist, singer and songwriter 
 November 2 – Arun Shourie, Indian author and economist
 November 5 – Art Garfunkel, American singer (Simon and Garfunkel)
 November 6
 Guy Clark, American singer, songwriter (d. 2016)
 Doug Sahm, American musician (d. 1999)
 November 7 – Angelo Scola, Italian cardinal
 November 9 – Tom Fogerty, American guitarist (Creedence Clearwater Revival) (d. 1990)
 November 13 – Dack Rambo, American actor (d. 1994)
 November 17 – Tova Traesnaes, Norwegian-American cosmetician and businesswoman; widow of actor Ernest Borgnine
 November 18 – David Hemmings, English actor (d. 2003)
 November 19 – Dan Haggerty, American actor (Grizzly Adams) (d. 2016)
 November 20
 Dr. John, American singer and songwriter (d. 2019)
 Oliver Sipple, decorated US Marine, Vietnam War veteran (d. 1989)
 November 21 – İdil Biret, Turkish pianist
 November 22 – Tom Conti, British actor, theatre director
 November 23
 Derek Mahon, Irish poet
 Franco Nero, Italian actor
 November 24 – Pete Best, English drummer
 November 25
 Ralph Haben, American politician, Speaker of the Florida House of Representatives
 Percy Sledge, African-American singer (d. 2015)
 Riaz Ahmed Gohar Shahi, Pakistani Sufi author, poet 
 November 27
 Tom Morga, American stuntman, stunt coordinator, and actor.
 Henry Carr, American Olympic athlete (d. 2015)
 Aime Jacquet, French football player, manager 
 Eddie Rabbitt, American country musician (d. 1998)
 November 28 – Laura Antonelli, Italian actress (d. 2015)
 November 29
 Lothar Emmerich, German footballer (d. 2003)
 Bill Freehan, American baseball player

December

 December 1 
 Nigel Rodley, English international human rights lawyer (d. 2017)
 Sean S. Cunningham, American filmmaker, director, producer, and writer
 December 4 
 David Johnston, Australian newsreader
 Leila Säälik, Estonian actress 
 December 6
 Wende Wagner, American actress (d. 1997)
 Richard Speck, American mass murderer (d. 1991)
 December 8 – Geoff Hurst, English footballer
 December 9
 Beau Bridges, American actor
 Dan Hicks, American singer, songwriter (d. 2016)
 December 10 
 Tommy Rettig, American actor (d. 1996)
 Peter Sarstedt, English singer, songwriter (d. 2017)
 Kyu Sakamoto, Japanese singer, actor ("Sukiyaki") (d. 1985)
 December 11
 J. Frank Wilson, American singer (d. 1991)
 Max Baucus, American politician and diplomat
 December 12 – Vitaly Solomin, Soviet and Russian actor, director and screenwriter (d. 2002)
 December 13 – John Davidson, American singer, actor
 December 16 
 Poldy Bird, Argentine writer (d. 2018)
 Vittorio Mezzogiorno, Italian actor (d. 1994)
 December 19
 Lee Myung-bak, 17th President of the Republic of Korea
 Maurice White, African-American singer, songwriter, musician and record producer (d. 2016)
 December 21
 Lo Hoi-pang, Hong Kong-born Chinese actor
 Jared Martin, American actor (d. 2017)
 December 23
 Ron Bushy, American rock musician 
 Tim Hardin, American folk musician (d. 1980)
 Mamnoon Hussain, 12th President of Pakistan (d. 2021)
 December 24 
 Hans Eichel, German politician
 Lex Hixon, American Sufi author, poet, and spiritual teacher (d. 1995)
 December 27 
 Miles Aiken, American basketball player and coach
 Younoussi Touré, 4th prime minister of Mali (d. 2022)
 December 29 – Ray Thomas, English flautist, singer and songwriter (The Moody Blues) (d. 2018)
 December 30 – Mel Renfro, American football player
 December 31 – Sir Alex Ferguson, Scottish football manager (Manchester United)

Deaths

January

 
 January 1 – József Konkolics, Hungarian Slovene writer (b. 1861)
 January 4 – Henri Bergson, French philosopher, recipient of the Nobel Prize in Literature (b. 1859)
 January 5 – Amy Johnson, English aviator (aviation accident) (b. 1903)
 January 8
 Robert Baden-Powell, 1st Baron Baden-Powell, English soldier; founder of the Scouts (b. 1857)
 Viktor Dankl von Krasnik, Austro-Hungarian general (b. 1854)
 January 10
 Frank Bridge, English composer (b. 1879)
 Sir John Lavery, Anglo-Irish artist (b. 1856)
 January 11 – Emanuel Lasker, German chess champion (b. 1868)
 January 13 – James Joyce, Irish writer, poet (b. 1882)
 January 15 – Guglielmo Pecori Giraldi, Italian nobleman, general and politician (b. 1856)
 January 21 – Rudolf von Brudermann, Austro-Hungarian general (b. 1851)
 January 24 – Josslyn Hay, 22nd Earl of Erroll, British aristocrat (murder) (b. 1901)
 January 29 – Ioannis Metaxas, Greek military officer, politician and Prime Minister of Greece (b. 1871)

February

 February 2 – Harris Laning, American admiral (b. 1873)
 February 4 – George Lloyd, 1st Baron Lloyd, British politician and diplomat (b. 1879)
 February 5 
 Banjo Paterson, Australian poet and journalist (b. 1864)
 Otto Strandman, 1st Prime Minister of Estonia (b. 1875)
 February 7 – Giuseppe Tellera, Italian general (died of wounds) (b. 1882)
 February 9 – Aaron S. Watkins, American temperance movement leader (b. 1863)
 February 11 – Rudolf Hilferding, German economist, Minister of Finance (b. 1877)
 February 13 – Blind Boy Fuller, African-American blues musician (b. 1904)
 February 21 – Frederick Banting, Canadian physician, recipient of the Nobel Prize in Physiology or Medicine (b. 1891)
 February 24 – Lothar von Arnauld de la Perière, German submarine commander (b. 1886)
 February 27 – William D. Byron, U.S. Congressman (b. 1895)
 February 28 – King Alfonso XIII of Spain (b. 1886)

March

 March 4 – Ludwig Quidde, German activist, politician and Nobel Prize laureate (b. 1858)
 March 6 – Gutzon Borglum, American sculptor (Mount Rushmore) (b. 1867)
 March 8 – Sherwood Anderson, American author (b. 1876)
 March 14 – C. R. M. F. Cruttwell, English historian (b. 1887)
 March 15 – Alexej von Jawlensky, Russian painter (b. 1864)
 March 17 – Joachim Schepke, German submarine commander (killed in action) (b. 1912)
 March 18 – Alexander Pfänder, German philosopher (b. 1870)
 March 28
 Kavasji Jamshedji Petigara, Indian police commissioner (b. 1877)
 Virginia Woolf, English novelist (suicide) (b. 1882)
 March 30 – Vasil Kutinchev, Bulgarian general (b. 1859)

April
 April 3 – Pál Teleki, 2-time Prime Minister of Hungary (b. 1879)
 April 5 – Sir Nigel Gresley, English steam locomotive engineer (Flying Scotsman and Mallard) (b. 1876)
 April 13 – Annie Jump Cannon, American astronomer (b. 1863)
 April 16 – Josiah Stamp, British baron, banker, civil servant, industrialist, economist and statistician (enemy action) (b.1880)
 April 17 – Hans Driesch, German biologist, philosopher (b. 1867)
 April 24 – King Sisowath Monivong of Cambodia (b. 1875)
 April 30 – Edwin S. Porter, American film director (b. 1870)

May
 May 6 – Shūzō Kuki, Japanese philosopher (b. 1888)
 May 7 – James George Frazer, Scottish social anthropologist (b. 1854)
 May 11 – Peggy Shannon, American actress (b. 1910)
 May 12 – Ruth Stonehouse, American actress (b. 1892)
 May 16 – Minnie Vautrin, American missionary, heroine of the Nanjing Massacre (b. 1887)
 May 24 – Lancelot Holland, British admiral (died in action) (b. 1887)
 May 27 – Günther Lütjens, German admiral (killed in action) (b. 1889)
 May 30 – Prajadhipok, Rama VII, King of Siam (b. 1893)

June

 June 1
 Hans Berger, German neurologist (b. 1873)
 Jenny Dolly, American singer (b. 1892)
 Sir Hugh Walpole, New Zealand-born British novelist (b. 1884)
 June 2 – Lou Gehrig, American baseball player (New York Yankees), MLB Hall of Famer (b. 1903)
 June 4 – Wilhelm II, last Emperor of Germany (b. 1859)
 June 6 – Louis Chevrolet, Swiss-born automobile builder, race car driver (b. 1878)
 June 11 – Daniel Carter Beard, American scouting pioneer (b. 1850)
 June 15 – Evelyn Underhill, English Christian mystic (b. 1875)
 June 21 – Elliott Dexter, American actor (b. 1870)
 June 25 – Luigi Capello, Italian general (d. 1859)
 June 28 – Richard Carle, American actor (b. 1871)
 June 29 – Ignacy Jan Paderewski, Polish pianist, composer and third Prime Minister of Poland (b. 1860)

July

 July 1 – Mikhail Kaganovich, Soviet politician (b. 1888)
 July 3 – Friedrich Akel, Estonian diplomat, politician (b. 1871)
 July 4 – Antoni Łomnicki, Polish mathematician (b. 1881)
 July 10 – Jelly Roll Morton, African-American jazz musician, composer (b. 1890)
 July 11 – Arthur Evans, English archaeologist (b. 1851)
 July 15 – Walter Ruttmann, German director (b. 1887)
 July 20 – Lew Fields, American vaudeville performer (b. 1867)
 July 22 – Dmitry Pavlov, Soviet general (executed) (b. 1897)
 July 23 – José Quiñones Gonzales, Peruvian aviator (b. 1914)
 July 24 – Rudolf Ramek, 5th Chancellor of Austria (b. 1881)
 July 25 – Allan Forrest, American actor (b. 1885)
 July 26 – Henri Lebesgue, French mathematician (b. 1875)
 July 27
Homer Galpin, America politician and lawyer (b 1871)
Vladimir Klimovskikh, Soviet general (b. 1885)
 July 29 – James Stephenson, English-born actor (b. 1889)
 July 30
 Hugo Celmiņš, Prime Minister of Latvia (b. 1877)
 Mickey Welch, American baseball player, MLB Hall of Famer (b. 1859)

August

 August 1 –James Drake, Australian politician (b. 1850)
 August 7 – Rabindranath Tagore, Indian author, Nobel Prize laureate (b. 1861)
 August 12 – Freeman Freeman-Thomas, 1st Marquess of Willingdon, British politician and colonial administrator, 22nd Viceroy of India, 13th Governor General of Canada (b. 1866)
 August 13 – J. Stuart Blackton, American film producer (b. 1875)
 August 14
 Saint Maximilian Kolbe, German Roman Catholic priest (martyred in Auschwitz concentration camp) (b. 1894)
 Paul Sabatier, French chemist, Nobel Prize laureate (b. 1854)
 August 20 – John Baird, 1st Viscount Stonehaven, British politician, 8th Governor-General of Australia (b. 1874)
 August 30 – Peder Oluf Pedersen, Danish engineer and physicist (b. 1874)
 August 31 – Marina Tsvetaeva, Soviet Russian poet (suicide) (b. 1892)

September

 September 1 – Karl Parts, Estonian military commander (b. 1886)
 September 9 – Hans Spemann, German embryologist, recipient of the Nobel Prize in Physiology or Medicine (b. 1869)
 September 11 
 Alipio Ponce, Peruvian police officer, Civil Guard hero (b. 1906)
 Christian Rakovsky, Bulgarian revolutionary, Russian Bolshevik and Soviet diplomat, journalist, physician and essayist (executed) (b. 1873)
 Maria Spiridonova, Russian revolutionary, former leader of the Party of Left Socialist Revolutionaries (executed) (b. 1884)
 September 18 – Fred Karno, English music hall impresario (b. 1866)
 September 20 – Mikhail Kirponos, Soviet general (b. 1892)

October
 October 5 – Louis Brandeis, U.S. Supreme Court Justice (b. 1856)
 October 8
 Gus Kahn, German songwriter (b. 1886)
 Valentine O'Hara, Irish author (b. 1875)
 October 9 – Helen Morgan, American singer and actress (b. 1900)
 October 16 – Sergei Efron, Russian poet and secret police operative (executed) (b. 1893)
 October 18 – Manuel Teixeira Gomes, 7th President of Portugal (b. 1860)
 October 22 – Ioan Glogojeanu, Romanian general (assassinated) (b. 1888)
 October 25 – Robert Delaunay, French painter (b. 1885)
 October 26
 Arkady Gaidar, Russian soldier and children's story writer (killed in action) (b. 1904)
 Victor Schertzinger, American composer, director (b. 1888)
 October 28
 20 Soviet military officers and politicians executed in Kuybyshev:
 Pavel Rychagov (b. 1911)
 Grigori Shtern (b. 1900)
 Yakov Smushkevich (b. 1902)
 Filipp Goloshchekin (b. 1876)
 Mikhail Kedrov (b. 1878)
 Aleksandr Loktionov (b. 1893)
 October 29
 Harvey Hendrick, American baseball player (b. 1897)
 Károly Huszár, 25th Prime Minister of Hungary (b. 1882)

November

 November 7 – Frank Pick, British transport administrator and patron of industrial design (b. 1878)
November 10 – Carrie Derick, Canadian botanist and geneticist (b. 1862)
 November 16 
 Miina Härma, Estonian composer (b. 1864)
 Sir Henry Wilson, British general (b. 1859)
 November 17 – Ernst Udet, German World War I fighter ace, Nazi Luftwaffe official (suicide) (b. 1896)
 November 18
 Émile Nelligan, Canadian poet (b. 1879)
 Walther Nernst, German chemist, Nobel Prize laureate (b. 1864)
 Chris Watson, 3rd Prime Minister of Australia (b. 1867)
 November 22 
 Kurt Koffka, German psychologist (b. 1886)
 Werner Mölders, German fighter pilot (b. 1913)
 November 23 – Henrietta Vinton Davis, American elocutionist, dramatist, impersonator and public speaker (b. 1860)
 November 25 – Pedro Aguirre Cerda, President of Chile (b. 1879)
 November 26 – Niels Hansen Jacobsen, Danish sculptor, ceramist (b. 1861)
 November 27 – Sir Charles Briggs, British general (b. 1865)

December

 December 2 – Edward Rydz-Śmigły, Polish marshal (b. 1886)
 December 3 – Christian Sinding, Norwegian composer (b. 1856)
 December 7 – Isaac C. Kidd, American admiral (killed in action) (b. 1884)
 December 8 – Izidor Kürschner, Hungarian football player and coach (b. 1885)
 December 9 – Eduard von Böhm-Ermolli, Austrian general, German field marshal (b. 1856)
 December 10 – Sir Tom Phillips, British admiral (killed in action) (b. 1888)
 December 11 – Émile Picard, French mathematician (b. 1856)
 December 15 – Blessed Martyrs of Drina, Croatian nuns
 December 25 – Blanche Bates, American stage actress (b. 1873)
 December 29 – Tullio Levi-Civita, Italian mathematician (b. 1873)
 December 30 – El Lissitzky, Russian artist, architect (b. 1890)

Nobel Prizes

 Physics – not awarded
 Chemistry – not awarded
 Medicine – not awarded
 Literature – not awarded
 Peace – not awarded

References

Further reading
 William K. Klingaman. 1941: Our Lives in a World on the Edge (1988) world perspective based on primary sources by a scholar.